This is a list of consorts of Maine, a former province of France. 

Joan the Lame and Joan I, Countess of Auvergne, became Queen of France following the ascension of their husbands to the throne.

Countess of Maine

First Creation

Rorgonid dynasty

Hugonid dynasty 

Disputed (1051–1069)

House of Este

House of Baugency

House of Plantagenet

Second creation

Capetian House of Anjou

Third creation

House of Valois

Fourth creation

House of Valois

Fifth creation

House of Valois-Anjou

Sixth Creation

House of Lorraine

Duchess of Maine

Legitimised branch of the House of Bourbon, 1673–1736

See also
List of consorts of Anjou
List of consorts of Normandy
List of consorts of Lorraine
List of consorts of Provence
List of consorts of Mayenne

Sources

MAINE

 
 
Maine
Maine